Lenox Township may refer to the following places in the United States:

 Lenox Township, Warren County, Illinois
 Lenox Township, Iowa County, Iowa
 Lenox Township, Michigan
 Lenox Township, Ashtabula County, Ohio
 Lenox Township, Pennsylvania

Township name disambiguation pages